Jaitra Yatra is a 1991 Telugu-language social problem film written and directed by Uppalapati Narayana Rao. It stars Nagarjuna and Vijayashanti, with music composed by S. P. Balasubrahmanyam. The film was produced by Sravanthi Ravi Kishore under the Sri Sravanthi Movies banner. Upon release, the film received positive reviews but was not commercially successful. The film is based on the theme of Ardh Satya (1983). The film was dubbed in Tamil as Pongada Neengalum Unga Arasiyalum.

Plot
Teja is an orphan in the city who studies law. He falls in love with Vijayashanti, who is also a law student in his college. One day he sees Delhi Ganesh, who takes a picture of him as he follows him to his village. He finds out that Delhi Ganesh is his father that was a thief until a police officer raped and killed his wife. He wanted Nagarjuna to become a successful person and not end up like him. Unable to raise him himself, he sends his son to an orphanage. Nagarjuna experiences the life in his village as he knows how dangerous people are and that they're forced to become thieves. He meets Chandra Mohan, who gets arrested for a robbery he was framed in as Nagarjuna tries to stop the cops. They arrest Nagarjuna  as Delhi Ganesh forces the villains who rule the village to let him go. Delhi Ganesh, worried about how Nagarjuna will end up, tells him to go back to the city. Nagarjuna goes back to the city, but then decides to come back to the village to help the people that are living miserably and forced to commit crimes. They all think of Nagarjuna as a great man as the villains try to stop him. How Nagarjuna protects and saves everyone in the village forms the rest of the story.

Cast

Soundtrack
The film songs composed by S. P. Balasubrahmanyam. Music released on Lahari Audio Company.

References

1991 films
Films about corruption in India
Films scored by S. P. Balasubrahmanyam
1990s Telugu-language films